

Events
 January 11 – It is announced that Lan Shui will stand down as music director of the Singapore Symphony Orchestra in January 2019.
 January 22 - The Shanghai Symphony Orchestra, the Guangzhou Symphony Orchestra, and the China Philharmonic Orchestra all announce the cancellation of scheduled concert appearances with Korean soprano Sumi Jo, without formal explanation.  It is suggested by some that political tensions between the South Korean and Chinese governments have caused the cancellation of concerts by Sumi Jo and other Korean performers.
 April 10 - Du Yun is awarded the 2017 Pulitzer Prize for Music for her composition, Angel's Bone.
 September 30 - Tan Dun is awarded the Golden Lion for Lifetime Achievement at the Venice Biennale.

Albums
Band-Maid - Just Bring It
E-girls - E.G. Crazy
Hello Venus - Mystery of Venus
Koda Kumi - W Face: Inside/Outside
Mito Natsume - Natsumelo
Anupam Roy - Ebar Morle Gachh Hawbo
Regine Velasquez - R3.0
Navneet Aditya Waiba - Ama Lai Shraddhanjali
Sachin Warrier - Kanave Kalayathe

Classical
 Sofia Gubaidulina – Triple Concerto for Violin, Cello, and Bayan

Opera
Sukanya, with music by Ravi Shankar and libretto by Amit Chaudhuri

Musical films
Alamara
Anaarkali of Aarah
Arjunan Kadhali
Dr. Nawariyan (Sri Lanka), with music by Dinesh Subasinghe 
Duvvada Jagannadham
Love Is a Broadway Hit
 Our Shining Days (China), starring Xu Lu and Peng Yuchang

Deaths
January 2 - Barbara Fei, 85, Hong Kong opera singer.
January 14 - Yama Buddha, 29, Nepalese rapper
February 8 - Rina Matsuno, 18, Japanese pop singer (lethal arrhythmia)
February 25 – Toshio Nakanishi, musician and producer, 61 (esophageal cancer)
March 1
Raajesh Johri, Indian singer-songwriter, 64 
Hiroshi Kamayatsu, Japanese singer and guitarist, 78
March 7 - Kalika Prasad Bhattacharya, 47, Indian folk singer and researcher
April 12 – Peggy Hayama, Japanese singer, 83
May 20 - Natalia Shakhovskaya, 81, Russian cellist
May 21 - Leo Kristi, Indonesian singer, 67 (kidney failure)
July 8 – Seiji Yokoyama, Japanese composer, 82
August 30 - Abdul Jabbar, 78, Bangladeshi singer
December 2 – Norihiko Hashida, Japanese folk singer-songwriter, 72
December 18 - Kim Jong-hyun, 27, South Korean singer-songwriter and radio host (carbon monoxide poisoning)

See also 
 2017 in music
 2017 in Japanese music

References 

Asia
Asian music
2017 in Asia